Armiiska (former Radianskoi Armii) is a station on Kharkiv Metro's Kholodnohirsko–Zavodska Line. It opened on 11 August 1978.

On 17 May 2016, the station was renamed conformed with the law banning Communist names in Ukraine.

References

Kharkiv Metro stations
Railway stations opened in 1978